Robert Hirsz (born 17 October 1989) is a Polish professional footballer who plays as a forward for IV liga club Włocłavia Włocławek.

Career
Born in Gdańsk, Hirsz began his career at Lechia Gdańsk making his debut on April 15, 2006. On 3 February 2019, Hirsz returned to Sokół Ostróda.

References

External links
 

1989 births
Living people
Polish footballers
Sportspeople from Gdańsk
Lechia Gdańsk players
Tur Turek players
APEP FC players
Bałtyk Gdynia players
Kaszubia Kościerzyna players
Bytovia Bytów players
Wigry Suwałki players
Legionovia Legionowo players
Sokół Ostróda players
Wisła Puławy players
Olimpia Grudziądz players
Cartusia Kartuzy players
Association football forwards
Ekstraklasa players
I liga players
II liga players
III liga players
Cypriot Second Division players
Polish expatriate footballers
Expatriate footballers in Cyprus
Polish expatriate sportspeople in Cyprus